Golden Best: 15th Anniversary is Zard's fifth compilation album. Released in October 2006 under B-Gram Records. The album peaked #1 at Oricon weekly, charted for eighty one weeks and sold 942,220 units.

Following the death of the band's vocalist Izumi Sakai in May 2007, the album immediately took the sixth spot at Oricon daily ranking after fans bought out copies of the release.

Track listing 
All songs has been written by Izumi Sakai.

Disc 1

Disc 2

In media
Good-bye My Loneliness: theme song for Japanese television drama "Kekkon no Risou to Genjitsu"
Nemurenai Yoru wo Daite: ending theme for TV Asahi program "Tonight"
In My Arms Tonight: theme song for Tokyo Broadcasting System Television television drama Gakkou ga Abunai
Makenaide: theme song for Nippon Television 24-hour TV
Kimi ga Inai: theme song for Japanese television drama "Kanojona Kiraina Kanojo"
Yureru Omoi: commercial song for Pocari Sweat
Mō Sukoshi, Ato Sukoshi...: ending theme for TV Asahi television drama Lullaby Keiji
Kitto Wasurenai: theme song for Fuji TV television drama Shiratori Reiko de Gozaimasu!
Kono Ai ni Oyogi Tsukaretemo: opening theme for Japanese television drama "Ai to Giwaku no Suspense"
Konna ni Soba ni Iru no ni: commercial song of Miki Corporation's "Boutique Joy"
Anata wo Kanjiteitai: commercial song for NTT DoCoMo
Ai ga Mienai: commercial song of FTShiseido's Sea Breeze 1995
Sayonara wa Ima mo Kono Mune ni Imasu: theme song for movie (based from television drama) Shiratori Reiko de Gozaimasu!
My Friend: 4th ending theme for Anime television series Slam Dunk
Kokoro wo Hiraite: commercial song for Pocari Sweat
Today Is Another Day: theme song for Anime television series Yawara!
Don't You See!: ending theme for Anime television series Dragon Ball GT
Eien: theme song of Japanese television drama adaptation of the novel A Lost Paradise
My Baby Grand ~Nukumori ga Hoshikute~: commercial film song for company NTT DoCoMo's DoCoMo 1997 Fuyu
Unmei no Roulette Mawashite: opening theme for Anime television series Detective Conan
Get U're Dream: theme song for NHK's Sydney Olympics
Kyō wa Yukkuri Hanasō: commercial song of Gekkeikan's Tsuki
Hoshi no Kagayaki yo: opening theme for Anime television series Detective Conan
Natsu wo Matsu Sail no You ni: theme song for anime movie Detective Conan: Strategy Above the Depths
Heart ni Hi wo Tsukete: theme song for Tokyo Broadcasting System Television program Suteki ni common!

References 

Zard albums
2006 compilation albums
Being Inc. compilation albums
Japanese-language compilation albums